Şahsevən or Shakhsevan may refer to:
Şahsevən, Aghjabadi, Azerbaijan
Şahsevən, Kurdamir, Azerbaijan
Şahsevən Təzəkənd, Azerbaijan
Shakhsevan Tretye, Azerbaijan
Birinci Şahsevən, Azerbaijan
İkinci Şahsevən, Azerbaijan